In the mathematical field of graph theory, a hypergraph  is called a hypertree if it admits a host graph  such that  is a tree. Hypertrees have also been called arboreal hypergraphs or tree hypergraphs.

Therefore, hypertrees may be seen as a generalization of the notion of a tree for hypergraphs. They include the connected Berge-acyclic hypergraphs, which have also been used as a (different) generalization of trees for hypergraphs.

Properties
Every hypertree has the Helly property (2-Helly property): if a subset  of its hyperedges has the property that every two hyperedges in  have a nonempty intersection, then  itself has a nonempty intersection (a vertex that belongs to all hyperedges in ).

By results of Duchet, Flament and Slater hypertrees may be equivalently characterized in the following ways.
A hypergraph  is a hypertree if and only if it has the Helly property and its line graph is a chordal graph.
A hypergraph is a hypertree if and only if its dual hypergraph is alpha-acyclic in the sense of Fagin.

It is possible to recognize hypertrees (as duals of alpha-acyclic hypergraphs) in linear time.
The exact cover problem (finding a set of non-overlapping hyperedges that covers all the vertices) is solvable in polynomial time for hypertrees but remains NP-complete for alpha-acyclic hypergraphs.

See also
Dually chordal graph, a graph whose maximal cliques form a hypertree

Notes

References

.
.
.
.
.
.
.
.

Hypergraphs
Trees (graph theory)